883 Matterania is an S-type asteroid belonging to the Flora family in the Main Belt. Its rotation period is 5.64 hours

References

External links 
 
 

000883
000883
Discoveries by Max Wolf
Named minor planets
000883
19170914